Maize flour or corn flour is a flour ground from dried maize (corn). It is a common staple food, and is ground to coarse, medium, and fine consistencies. Coarsely ground corn flour (meal) is known as cornmeal. When maize flour is made from maize that has been soaked in an alkaline solution, e.g., limewater (a process known as nixtamalization), it is called masa harina (or masa flour), which is used for making arepas, tamales and tortillas.

See also 

 Semolina
 List of maize dishes

References 

Flour
Flour